Windsor Park is a small suburb located on the North Shore of Auckland, which is in New Zealand. There are multiple shops at Windsor Park, including Winsor Park Baptist Church, a KFC, a lawnmower shop, a bakery, a dairy (grocery), and even a private residence above the dairy..

Demographics

Windsor Park had a population of 1,683 at the 2018 New Zealand census, an increase of 69 people (4.3%) since the 2013 census, and an increase of 183 people (12.2%) since the 2006 census. There were 642 households, comprising 747 males and 936 females, giving a sex ratio of 0.8 males per female. The median age was 43.3 years (compared with 37.4 years nationally), with 258 people (15.3%) aged under 15 years, 315 (18.7%) aged 15 to 29, 675 (40.1%) aged 30 to 64, and 438 (26.0%) aged 65 or older.

Ethnicities were 49.7% European/Pākehā, 3.2% Māori, 1.6% Pacific peoples, 47.2% Asian, and 3.0% other ethnicities. People may identify with more than one ethnicity.

The percentage of people born overseas was 58.6, compared with 27.1% nationally.

Although some people chose not to answer the census's question about religious affiliation, 49.4% had no religion, 39.0% were Christian, 0.2% had Māori religious beliefs, 1.4% were Hindu, 0.7% were Muslim, 2.5% were Buddhist and 1.6% had other religions.

Of those at least 15 years old, 471 (33.1%) people had a bachelor's or higher degree, and 168 (11.8%) people had no formal qualifications. The median income was $27,300, compared with $31,800 nationally. 222 people (15.6%) earned over $70,000 compared to 17.2% nationally. The employment status of those at least 15 was that 558 (39.2%) people were employed full-time, 174 (12.2%) were part-time, and 33 (2.3%) were unemployed.

Education

Founded in 1956, it is now the largest secondary school in New Zealand.

It is a Kura Kaupapa Māori school which places a strong emphasis on the revitalisation and retention of te reo Māori.

Sport
East Coast Bays Rugby Club is located in Windsor Park and is one of the largest rugby clubs in the southern hemisphere. It shares its clubrooms with East Coast Bays Cricket Club

Notes

Suburbs of Auckland
North Shore, New Zealand